B'Ho Kirkland (April 9, 1912 – February 20, 2004) was an American football offensive lineman who played in the National Football League.

Born in Columbia, Alabama, he played for the University of Alabama from 1931 to 1933 and was a letterman all three years.  He was picked up by the Brooklyn Dodgers in 1935.  He played until 1936.  In total, he played in 23 games starting 17 of those.  He played with Bear Bryant both on the college level and the professional level.  He was number 38.

References

External links

1912 births
2004 deaths
People from Houston County, Alabama
Players of American football from Alabama
American football offensive guards
Alabama Crimson Tide football players
Brooklyn Dodgers (NFL) players